The Alvis Pelides was an unflown British air-cooled radial aero engine first developed in 1936. The Pelides Major was a projected but unbuilt development as were the Alcides, Alcides Major and the Maeonides Major, the Alvis aircraft engine range taking their names from Greek mythology.

Design and development
The Pelides was the first aero engine of Alvis design; the company had previously only built the French Gnome-Rhône Mistral Major under license. With the two companies working closely together the 14 cylinder radial layout of this engine retained metric dimensions but substituted metric screw threads with British fasteners such as BSF and Whitworth. Material specifications were different as were the detail design of internal parts such as the crankpin. The Pelides passed a 50-hour Air Ministry type test in 1937 where it produced 1,065 hp (794 kW) but no aircraft application was found and only 15 engines were built. The onset of the Second World War caused the abandonment of any further development of the Pelides and its related designs.

Variants (projected)
Pelides  2-row 14-cylinder radial,  (bore x stroke), LH or RH, d/d, 13:19 or 0.5:1.
Alcides MajorThe Alcides Major was an improved supercharged version of the Alcides.

Specifications (Pelides)

See also

References

Notes

Bibliography

 Flight magazine - 15 April 1937 (Flightglobal.com)
 Gunston, Bill. World Encyclopedia of Aero Engines. Cambridge, England. Patrick Stephens Limited, 1989. 
 Lumsden, Alec. British Piston Engines and their Aircraft. Marlborough, Wiltshire: Airlife Publishing, 2003. .

External links
Alvis Pelides displayed at a 1938 trade fair - Flightglobal.com

Aircraft air-cooled radial piston engines
Pelides
1930s aircraft piston engines